Pablo Records was a jazz record company and label founded by Norman Granz in 1973, more than a decade after he had sold his earlier catalog (including Verve Records) to MGM Records.

Pablo initially featured recordings by acts that Granz managed: Ella Fitzgerald, Oscar Peterson, and Joe Pass. Later, the label issued recordings by Count Basie, Dizzy Gillespie, Sarah Vaughan, Milt Jackson, and Paulinho da Costa. The label also re-released 1950s recordings by Art Tatum, which Granz reacquired, and released unissued European live recordings of John Coltrane and his groups.

In January 1987, it was announced that the label had been acquired by Fantasy Records for an undisclosed amount. Eric Miller, who had worked with Norman Granz since the early 1970s, continued with Pablo as head of A&R, until the early-2000s. Fantasy continued to release previously unissued recordings using the Pablo name.

Discography

Pablo 2310-700 Series
The Pablo 2310-700 Series were released between 1974 and 1977

Pablo 2310-800 Series
The Pablo 2310-800 Series were released between 1978 and 1983.

Pablo 2310-900 Series
the Pablo 2310-900 Series ran from 1984 until 2004 and in 1991 began issuing compact discs exclusively.

Pablo Live 2308-200 SeriesJazzlists: Pablo 2380-200 series discography, accessed May 24, 2019
The Pablo Live 200 Series commenced with a number of albums recorded at the 1977 Montreux Jazz Festival and continued until 1986 releasing historical and commissioned live recordings.

Pablo Today 2312-100 Series
The Pablo Today 2312-100 released albums from 1979 until 1984 when it remained dormant until a double CD of material by Sarah Vaughan was released in 1999.

Pablo Live 2620-100 SeriesJazzlists: Pablo 2620-100 series discography, accessed May 24, 2019
The Pablo Live 100 Series commenced in 1977 and featured double (or multiple) LP live albums of historical and commissioned recordings up until 1986. In 2002 two CDs of historical recordings were released on the series

Pablo 2625-700 series
The Pablo 2625–700 series were released in 1974-84 and featured a mix of double LP and multiple LP box sets of live albums, compilations, and other recordings.

Pablo Today 2630-200 Series
The Pablo Today 2630-200 Series consisted of one double LP album released in 1981.

Pablo Live 2640-100 Series
The Pablo Live 2640-100 Series consisted of two double LP sets (one live and one studio recording) which were released in 1983

Pablo 5300 Series
The Pablo 5300 Series consisted of compact discs of unreleased concert performances usually from Norman Granz' Jazz at the Philharmonic tours of Europe released between 1996 and 2002.

See also 
 List of record labels

References

External links

Defunct record labels of the United States
Jazz record labels
Record labels established in 1972
Record labels disestablished in 1987
Pablo Records albums